Najran is a region of Saudi Arabia, located in the south of the country along the border with Yemen. It has an area of 149,511 km². Its capital is Najran.

Najran is inhabited by the Yam tribe. A significant percentage of the province's inhabitants are Shia Ismaili. The current governor of the region is Prince Jiluwi bin Abdulaziz Al Saud.

Etymology
The name derives from Najran Ibn Zaidan Ibn Saba' Ibn Yashgub Ibn Yarub Ibn Qahtan, said to be the first person to inhabit the area.

Geography
Najran contains three geographical areas. First, the flat area which lies in the middle of Najran. It has several valleys, the most famous of them being Najran’s valley. Second, the mountainous area which is in the west and the north. There the weather is moderate in summer. It has several parks shaded by nabk trees. It has important governorate centers: Habuna governorate, Badr El-Junoob governorate and Yadmah governorate; the latter governorate won King Fahd’s attention because it has mineral wealth. The most important of all is the gold area where much gold was mined that lies in El-Johns area, which follows Safah center. Many of the mountains are distinguished by granite rocks, where marble and granite are quarried, providing a large part of the Kingdom’s needs. Third, the sandy area which lies in the east and is a part of the Empty Quarter. It is extremely rich in oil and water.

Governorates
 Al Khirkhir (4,015)
 Badr Al Janub (11,117)
 Hubuna (20,400)
 Khubash (22,133)
 Najran (329,112)
 Sharurah (85,977)
 Thar (16,047)
 Yadamah (16,851)
 Al-Wadiah (5,000)

Najran Valley Dam
Najran Valley Dam is considered to be one of the most important civil places in Najran Region because of its position and scenery. It is 35 km from Najran town. On this dam, there is a road 4.5 meters wide. It was built from concrete blocks, and has a system of water pipes which keeps the water cold.

As-Saud Waterfall
As-Saud Waterfall is located in Najran, and can be seen from a considerable distance away.

Population

Governors of Najran
 Fahd bin Khalid Al Sudairi ?–1997
 Mishaal bin Saud 1997–2008
 Mishaal bin Abdullah Al Saud 2009–2013
 Jiluwi bin Abdulaziz Al Saud 2013-

Religious groups in Najran
Najran, a fertile valley in what is now southwestern Saudi Arabia at the foot of mountains bordering the vast stretch of desert known as the Empty Quarter, was traditionally home to Christian and Jewish communities, in addition to Sulaymani Ismailis and Zaidis. Christians have been absent from Najran for some centuries, and the remaining Jewish community is believed to have left in 1949, following the establishment of the state of Israel. Najran's Zaidi community in 2008 numbers around 2,000.

The 2004 Saudi census put the number of inhabitants in Najran at around 408,000. Sulaymani Ismailis, widely believed to constitute a large majority of the Najrani population, share an identity based on historical, cultural, and religious roots. In Najran city, the Khushaiwa compound, with its Mansura mosque complex, is the spiritual capital of the Sulaymani branch of the Ismaili sect, one of two major strands of contemporary Ismailism. Most Ismailis in Najran belong to one of two tribes: Yam and the Hamdan. These tribes also inhabit territory that today lies in Yemen. There are also some Sunnis of the Yam tribe, both recent converts as well as those who have adhered to Sunni Islam for generations.

Ancient Christian community

Najran is known for being home to an ancient settlement of Christians in the Arabian peninsula. They signed the "Najran Pact" in the 7th century with the Islamic prophet, Muhammad, promising them fair treatment as "protected subjects" (dhimmi) of the newly conquered territories. The village is now abandoned.

Culture

Cuisine
The local dishes in Najran include:
 Al-Burr: a breakfast meal which consists of bread made from wheat and flour, it is mixed and given the round ball shape and a hole is made to put milk, honey or dates in it
 Al-Wafed: a thick kind of bread made of wheat and is also made in round shape, it is served in Al-Matrah beside Al-Marg
 Al-Maasooba: made of corn flour meshed and some soup added is to make it soft, and it is usually served in a special ceremonies
 Ar-Ruksh: a soft kind of bread which comes in the shape of slice and it is served in the pot made of stone and then it is mixed with the soup
 Al-Margoog: consists of dough which is cut into small slices and it is cooked with soup and vegetables

Folk arts
Najran has some folk arts including traditional clay techniques. The houses are built of light tan clay in the shape of a rectangle. On the other hand, Najran has different kinds of traditional dance. For example, Al-Zamil which is an enthusiastic kind of poetry refers to special occasion in which so many men share together in the middle of a circle formed by old men. The stanzas of Al-Zamil are chosen carefully to express the subject for the occasion. Furthermore, Al-Zamil is considered to express emotions, and some time for apologies. Al-Razffah describes a dance which is used for wedding, or for happy occasions. Choirs come into rows and they sing poetry. Al-Razffah has a special time and special voice. Between the two rows two men meet each other and they dance in specific movements holding stilettos or sticks in their hands. Also there is another art that is (Laa'bat Ateran) done by black men.

See also

 Greater Yemen
 South Arabia

References

 Minosa, Tchekof. Najran: Desert Garden of Arabia. Paris: Scorpio , n.d

External links

 Travel through the province of Najran, Splendid Arabia: A travel site with photos and routes

 
Provinces of Saudi Arabia